Ger "Redser" O'Grady (born 1979 in Thurles, County Tipperary) is an Irish sportsperson.  He plays hurling with his local club Thurles Sarsfields and is a former member of the Tipperary senior inter-county team.

Ger O'Grady was born in Thurles, County Tipperary in 1979.  He was educated locally and plays his club hurling with Thurles Sarsfields.  He was captain of the team in 2005 when they won their first County Senior Hurling title in thirty-one years.  O'Grady has played for Tipperary at minor, Under-21 & Intermediate level, winning a Munster Under-21 medal as a substitute in 1999.  O'Grady made his competitive debut for the Tipperary senior hurlers in the 2003 National League against Offaly.  Later that year he made his Championship debut against Laois in the All-Ireland Qualifiers.

See also
Tipperary Player Profiles

1979 births
Living people
Thurles Sarsfields hurlers
Tipperary inter-county hurlers